Thereianthus is a genus of flowering plants in the family Iridaceae, first described as a genus in 1941. The entire genus is endemic to Cape Province in South Africa.

The genus name is derived from the Greek words thereios, meaning "summer", and anthos, meaning "flower".

Species

 Thereianthus bracteolatus (Lam.) G.J.Lewis
 Thereianthus bulbiferus Goldblatt & J.C.Manning
 Thereianthus elandsmontanus Goldblatt & J.C.Manning
 Thereianthus intermedius J.C.Manning & Goldblatt
 Thereianthus ixioides G.J.Lewis
 Thereianthus juncifolius (Baker) G.J.Lewis
 Thereianthus longicollis (Schltr.) G.J.Lewis
 Thereianthus minutus (Klatt) G.J.Lewis
 Thereianthus montanus J.C.Manning & Goldblatt
 Thereianthus racemosus (Klatt) G.J.Lewis
 Thereianthus spicatus (L.) G.J.Lewis

References

Iridaceae genera
Endemic flora of South Africa
Iridaceae